Henry Gordon Taylor  (12 March 1908 in Foster, Victoria – 18 November 1987 in Auckland) was a New Zealand Anglican priest and military chaplain.

He was born in Foster, Victoria, Australia in 1908. As a child, his family moved to New Zealand. There, he received a BA degree from University of Auckland.

References

1908 births
1987 deaths
New Zealand Anglican priests
New Zealand military chaplains
Australian emigrants to New Zealand
People from Foster, Victoria